The FPSO Kwame Nkrumah is a floating production storage and offloading (FPSO) vessel. It operates in the Jubilee oil fields off the coast of Ghana.  She is named after the first president of Ghana Kwame Nkrumah.

History
VLCC tanker Tohdoh was built by Mitsui Eng. & Shipbuilding Co.,Ltd. in 1991. She was owned and operated by NYK Line.  In 2008, she was sold to MODEC for US$42.5 million.  MODEC renamed the ship Ohdoh and started her conversion into FPSO vessel.  Conversion was done by SembCorp Marine at the Jurong Shipyard in Singapore.  On 1 May 2010, the vessel was renamed Kwame Nkrumah MV21, and on 15 May 2010 she started her trip for her base in the Western Coast of Ghana.  She arrived in Ghana on 21 June 2010. The vessel is estimated to cost US$875 million.

Other Ghana FPSOs
FPSO John Evans Atta Mills
FPSO John Agyekum Kufour

Technical description
It is about the size of three standard football fields put together.

References 

Petroleum industry in Ghana
Floating production storage and offloading vessels
1991 ships
Ships built by Mitsui Engineering and Shipbuilding